Braden (also known as Lima) is an unincorporated community in Tyler County, West Virginia, United States.

The community has the name of Glenn Braden, a business official.

References

Unincorporated communities in Tyler County, West Virginia
Unincorporated communities in West Virginia